Megasis is a genus of snout moths described by Achille Guenée in 1845.

Species
 Megasis alpherakii Ragonot, 1887
 Megasis hyrcanella Ragonot, 1893
 Megasis lesurella D. Lucas, 1932
 Megasis noctileucella Ragonot, 1887
 Megasis philippella (Viette, 1970)
 Megasis pupillatella Ragonot, 1887
 Megasis ragonoti P. Leraut, 2003
 Megasis rippertella (Zeller, 1839)
 Megasis satanella Ragonot, 1887

References

Phycitini
Pyralidae genera